Radical Action to Unseat the Hold of Monkey Mind is a box set of live performances by King Crimson, released on 2 September 2016. It is the first full-length release by the seven member incarnation of the group that formed in 2013.

The box set was recorded during King Crimson's 2015 tours of Japan, Canada and France, mostly in Takamatsu, Japan. The material performed is mostly from the 1969–1974 period, and most had not been performed live since the 1970s, although the songs were rearranged to suit the current line-up. Also included are some pieces from 1995 and onward, alongside new material. The title is derived from a song of the same name that the band has been playing in concert.

The set was released in two editions: a 4-disc standard edition featuring the complete concert in one Blu-ray disc and three CDs (individually themed "virtual studio albums" with no audible audience); and a 6-disc deluxe limited edition, featuring the same as the standard edition plus two DVDs with the complete concert and an expanded booklet. The Blu-ray disc has a "picture off" mode which allows listening to the music without the video.

Track listing

Disc one, Mainly Metal

Disc two, Easy Money Shots

Disc three, Crimson Classics

Personnel
King Crimson
 Pat Mastelotto – drums, electronic drums, percussion
 Bill Rieflin – drums, electronic drum, percussion, sampled Mellotron, synthesizer
 Gavin Harrison – drums, electronic drums, percussion, audio pre-production
 Mel Collins – saxophones, flutes
 Tony Levin – bass, extended-range bass, funk fingers, electric upright bass, Chapman Stick, backing vocals
 Jakko Jakszyk – guitar, voice, flute, audio pre-production
 Robert Fripp – guitar, guitar synth, keyboards, Soundscapes, production, mixing, additional footage

additional staff
 DGM – management
 David Singleton – mixing, production, video compiling, liner notes
 Chris Porter – engineering, mixing
 Alex R. Mundy – digital assembly
 Trevor Wilkins – filming, editing, booklet photography
 Sid Smith – additional footage
 Patrick Cleasby – video transfer
 Opus Productions
 Neil Wilkes – Blu-ray disc & DVD authoring & assembly
 Claire Bidwell – Blu-ray disc & DVD layout & design
 Bob Romano, Tim McDonnel, Alberto Fas, John Kimber, "Philly" Bob Squires, Jon Urban, Adam Blue Buckely – disc testing
 Francesca Sundsten – "Cyclops" cover painting
 Ben Singleton – additional artwork, Cyclops re-imagining
 Steve Ball – DGM logo
 Claudia Hahn – booklet photography
 Scarlet Page – photography (gatefold inner sleeve photos)
 Hugh O'Donnell – design and layout

Charts

References

King Crimson albums
2016 compilation albums
2016 live albums